Shonbeh Rural District is in Shonbeh and Tasuj District of Dashti County, Bushehr province, Iran. At the census of 2006, its population was 6,361 in 1,322 households; there were 4,454 inhabitants in 1,088 households at the following census of 2011; and in the most recent census of 2016, the population of the rural district was 4,808 in 1,322 households. The largest of its 19 villages was Baghan, with 1,574 people.

References 

Rural Districts of Bushehr Province
Populated places in Dashti County